Bernard Duffy (9 February 1898 – 1978) was a Scottish footballer who played in the Football League for Chelsea and Clapton Orient.

References

1898 births
1978 deaths
Scottish footballers
Association football midfielders
English Football League players
Burnbank Athletic F.C. players
Bellshill Athletic F.C. players
Chelsea F.C. players
Leyton Orient F.C. players
Ards F.C. players
Shelbourne F.C. players
Dundalk F.C. players